Women were first allowed to vote at the federal level in Canada in the 1917 general election in connection with military service, and were allowed to vote under the same conditions as men beginning on May 24, 1918. The next four elections saw only one woman elected: Agnes Macphail. The 1936 election saw two women in the House together for the first time. A by-election in 1941 saw a woman elected to the governing caucus for the first time. The 22nd federal election in 1953 was a slight breakthrough, electing four women, which was 1.5% of the House. Every Parliament thenafter would have at least two women at a time, except for the 28th Parliament from 1968 to 1972, in which Grace MacInnis was the only woman. Then 30th Parliament, elected in 1974, was another breakthrough, containing nine women MPs following the general election and rising to ten due to a by-election in 1976. The number of women in the House would not fall below ten again.

Meanwhile, in the Senate, Cairine Wilson was appointed as the first woman Senator in 1930. Additional women were added every few years, but it was not until two appointments in March 1979 that the Senate would even have ten women serving simultaneously.

Members of the House of Commons

* By by-election.

Senators

See also
Women in Canadian politics
Women in Canadian provincial and territorial legislatures

External links
Women in Parliament - Parliament of Canada
Current lists of women in the House of Commons - Parliament of Canada
Historical lists of women in the House of Commons - Parliament of Canada

Parliament, 14
27th Canadian Parliament
28th Canadian Parliament
29th Canadian Parliament
30th Canadian Parliament
31st Canadian Parliament
32nd Canadian Parliament